Shirley Blackburn Randleman (born October 14, 1950) is an American politician who served in the North Carolina Senate from the 30th district from 2013 to 2019. She previously served in the North Carolina House of Representatives from the 94th district from 2009 to 2013.

Electoral history

2022

2018

2016

2014

2012

2010

2008

References

|-

1950 births
Living people
Republican Party members of the North Carolina House of Representatives
Republican Party North Carolina state senators